Ramalingam Paramadeva was one of the architects of 1983 Batticaloa Jailbreak. After his escape he joined the Tamil Tigers. Later on behalf of Tamil Tigers he successfully carried out the 1984 Batticaloa Jailbreak, to release a female political inmate who was left behind in the first one.

He was one of the senior leaders of Tamil Tigers in Batticaloa and was killed  in 1984 at Kaluwanchikudy, Batticaloa District.

References

Liberation Tigers of Tamil Eelam members
Sri Lankan Tamil rebels
Sri Lankan rebels
1984 deaths
Year of birth missing
Place of birth missing